The Honor Farm is a drama and thriller film directed by Karen Skloss. It was released on March 10, 2017 in the South by Southwest Film Festival.

Synopsis 
After the prom, Lucy decides to join a group of young misfits to go to a psychedelic party on a haunted farm, where strange events are witnessed.

Cast 
 Olivia Applegate as Lucy
 Louis Hunter as  JD
 Dora Madison as Laila
 Liam Aiken as Sinclair
 Katie Folger as  Annie
 Michael Eric Reid as Jesse
 Mackenzie Astin as  Dr. Meyer
 Christina Parrish as  Zoe
 Josephine McAdam as  Shanti
 Jonny Mars as  Roosevelt
 Will Brittain as  Jacob
 Samuel Davis as  Sheldon

Reception 
On Rotten Tomatoes the film has a score of 67% based on reviews from 6 critics.

Charles Ealy, writing for the Austin American-Statesman, said it is a "what a cool idea for a movie: Tell a story that subverts every aspect of the horror genre, not in a satirical way but in a sweet and very mushroom-trippy way." Mike McGranaghan, from Aisle Seat, rated the film as "stylish, well-acted, and unique."

References

External links 
 

American thriller films
2017 thriller films
American drama films
2017 drama films
2010s English-language films
Films set on farms
2010s American films